Gordie Browne (born December 5, 1951) is a former American football tackle. He played for the New York Jets from 1974 to 1975.

References

1951 births
Living people
American football tackles
Boston College Eagles football players
New York Jets players